Cedar Lake is a lake in Scott County, in the U.S. state of Minnesota.

Cedar Lake was named for the groves of red cedar near the lake.

See also
List of lakes in Minnesota

References

Lakes of Minnesota
Lakes of Scott County, Minnesota